A result is the outcome of an event.

Result or Results may also refer to:

Music
 Results (album), a 1989 album by Liza Minnelli
 Results, a 2012 album by Murder Construct
 "The Result", a single by The Upsetters
 "The Result", a song by Ennio Morricone from A Fistful of Dollars O.S.T.

Other uses
 Result (schooner), a schooner built in Carrickfergus in 1893
 Result, New York, a populated place in Greene County
 Result (cricket)
 Results (film), a 2015 film starring Guy Pearce and Cobie Smulders
 Results (organisation), a US poverty advocacy organization founded 1980

See also
 Result merchant, see Glossary of contract bridge terms#R
 Results May Vary, an album by Limp Bizkit 2003
 Causality
 Find (disambiguation)
 Negative result (disambiguation)